Ager is an unincorporated community in Siskiyou County, California, United States.

References

General references
Historical marker: ''Ager Stage Stop Ager Beswick Road at Hornbrook Ager Road Ager

Unincorporated communities in California
Unincorporated communities in Siskiyou County, California